Kozluören can refer to:

 Kozluören, Azdavay
 Kozluören, Kestel